Carolina is a 2003 American-German romantic comedy film directed by Marleen Gorris, starring Julia Stiles, Shirley MacLaine, Alessandro Nivola, Mika Boorem, Randy Quaid, and Jennifer Coolidge.  Lisa Sheridan has a cameo role in the film, and Barbara Eden has the uncredited part of Daphne. It is set in Los Angeles, California. Shot in 2003, the film failed to find a distributor and was released direct-to-video in 2004.

Miramax Films was the domestic distributor, but failed to release it in theaters. When Harvey Weinstein screened the film he told the producers, "You have a hit movie on your hands. We're going to blast this on MTV all over Super Bowl Weekend." The producers never heard about it again until 2004 when it was suddenly released direct-to-DVD.

The film began principal photography in July 2001. Kathy Bates was cast in the role of Grandma Millicent Mirabeau, but dropped out after make-up and hair tests due to the shut down of the original production shoot date. Shirley MacLaine eventually stepped in to play the role.

Plot
Carolina Mirabeau was raised 'free-spirited' with two sisters by eccentric, domineering grandma Millicent in the country. Carolina's city neighbor, talented and witty Jewish author Albert Morris, is her best friend, confidant and the wacky family's favorite guest. Yet she begins dating Heath Pierson, an 'all too perfect' upper class brilliant Britton, whom she met in the TV studio where she's fired as a dating show candidates-screener. But the past and some truths catch up with all of them.

Cast

Reception

References

External links
 
 
 
 

2003 direct-to-video films
2003 films
2003 romantic comedy films
Films directed by Marleen Gorris
Films produced by Martin Bregman
American romantic comedy films
Films scored by Steve Bartek
2000s English-language films
2000s American films